Juyjan (also Romanized as Jūyjān) is a village in Jowzar Rural District, in the Central District of Mamasani County, Fars Province, Iran. At the 2006 census, its population was 823, in 226 families.

References 

Populated places in Mamasani County